Aman Thapa (born 3 January 1999) is an Indian professional footballer who plays as a winger for I-League club Rajasthan United.

Club career

Rajasthan United

In September 2021, Rajasthan United roped in Thapa ahead of the I-League Qualifiers. On 4 October, Thapa scored the winning goal against Ryntih in a thrilling encounter, which ended 3–2. He played a big role in the club's successful promotion campaign to the I-League, scoring two goals in six appearances.

In February 2022, he was resigned by the club ahead of the I-League restart after the tournament got suspended due to a COVID-19 outbreak among the players and staff. On 8 March, Thapa scored the historic first-ever goal for Rajasthan United in the I-League, in a 1–0 win against Aizawl.

Mohammedan
In June 2022, Thapa joined Mohammedan on a two-year deal. On 18 June, Rajasthan United officially objected to the transfer of Thapa to Mohammedan. The club has said he has a valid contract till 31 May, 2023.

Rajasthan United
Thapa returned to Rajasthan United, after the objection was accepted. He was made part of their Durand Cup squad.

Career statistics

Club

References

1999 births
Living people
Indian footballers
Association football midfielders
Sportspeople from Dehradun
Footballers from Uttarakhand
Rajasthan United FC players